Circobotys malaisei is a moth in the family Crambidae. It was described by Eugene G. Munroe and Akira Mutuura in 1970. It is found in Myanmar.

References

Moths described in 1970
Pyraustinae